Clariallabes mutsindoziensis is a species of airbreathing catfish endemic to Burundi where it is found in the Malagarasi River.  Its natural habitats are rivers and inland deltas. It is threatened by habitat loss.  This species grows to a length of 11.8 cm (4.6 inches) SL.

References

Sources
 

Clariallabes
Freshwater fish of East Africa
Fish of Burundi
Endemic fauna of Burundi
Fish described in 1998
Taxonomy articles created by Polbot